Formiga (in Portuguese "ant") is a municipality in central-west Minas Gerais state, Brazil.  The population of the municipality (urban and rural) in 2020 is 67,822.  The area of the municipality is 1,504 km2.  It is located in the statistical meso-region of Centro-Oeste de Minas and the statistical micro-region of Formiga.  It was founded in 1839.

Statistical Micro-region
Formiga is a statistical micro-region containing  municipalities: Arcos, Camacho, Córrego Fundo, Formiga, Itapecerica, Pains, Pedra do Indaiá, and Pimenta.  In 2000 the population of this area was 144,506 in an area of 4,577.20 km2.  The population density in 2000 was 31.57 inhabitants/km2.

Location and Municipal Boundaries
Formiga is located at an elevation of 841 meters just off highway MG-050.  Neighboring municipalities are: Pains, Córrego Fundo, Arcos, and Japaraíba (North), Pedra do Indaiá, Itapecerica, Camacho (East), Candeias, Cristais, and Guapé (South), and Pimenta (West).

Communications
Formiga is linked to Belo Horizonte by MG-050 and lies 2 km south of the highway junction.  There is also a railroad line carrying freight.  The closest point on the Furnas reservoir is 25 km to the southwest.

Distances to other cities
Divinópolis: 76 km
Bom Despacho: 110 km
Lavras: 115 km 
Arcos: 26 km
Belo Horizonte: 194 km
Rio de Janeiro: 545 km
São Paulo: 470 km
Brasília: 812 km

Weather
Average annual temperature: 21.3 C
Maximum annual temperature: 26.2 C
Minimum annual temperature: 15.1 C
Average annual rainfall index: 1.400 mm
Main rivers: Rio Formiga, Rio Mata-Cavalo, Rio Pouso Alegre and Furnas Reservoir.  Formiga is located in the Grande River basin.

Economy
Services, light industry, and agriculture are the most important economic activities.  In 2004 there were 2,481 enterprises, of which the majority were concentrated in the commerce sector, vehicle repair, and sales of personal and domestic objects. The GDP in 2005 was approximately R$474 million, R$44 million from taxes, 311 million reais from services, 67 million reais from industry, and 50 million reais from agriculture.  There were 1,865 rural producers on 77,000 hectares of land (2006).  229 farms had tractors (2006).  Approximately 5,600 persons were employed in agriculture.  The main crops are coffee, beans, soybeans, rice, sugarcane, and corn.  There were 69,000 head of cattle (2006).  Poultry raising was also substantial with two hundred head in 2006.

There were 7 banks (2007).  The motor vehicle fleet had 13,066 automobiles, 1,281 trucks, 1,255 pickup trucks, and 5,894 motorcycles.  The ratio of inhabitant per motor vehicle was 3 vehicles per inhabitant.

Working population by sector (2005)
Transformation industries (508 units): 4,368 workers
Construction (21 units): 974 workers
Commerce (1,447 units): 4,612 workers
Lodging and restaurants (124 units): 339 workers
Transport, storage, communications (132 units): 730 workers
Public administration: 1,694 workers
Health and social services:  512 workers

Health and education
In the health sector there were 31 public health clinics (2005) and 2 private hospitals with 116 beds.  Patients with more serious health conditions are transported to Divinópolis.  Educational needs of 13,800 students were met by 30 primary schools, 8 middle schools, and 25 pre-primary schools.  The private university UNIPAC has a campus in the city offering 19 undergraduate courses and 3 post-graduate courses. Formiga has one institute of higher learning—the Centro Universitário de Formiga UNIFORMG, offering 17 majors.

Municipal Human Development Index: 0.793 (2000)
State ranking: 65 out of 853 municipalities as of 2000
National ranking: 736 out of 5,138 municipalities as of 2000
Literacy rate: 91%
Life expectancy: 74 (average of males and females)

In 2000 the per capita monthly income of R$254.00 was below the state and national average of R$276.00 and R$297.00 respectively.  Poços de Caldas had the highest per capita monthly income in 2000 with R$435.00.  The lowest was Setubinha with R$73.00.

The highest ranking municipality in Minas Gerais in 2000 was Poços de Caldas with 0.841, while the lowest was Setubinha with 0.568.  Nationally the highest was São Caetano do Sul in São Paulo with 0.919, while the lowest was Setubinha.  In more recent statistics (considering 5,507 municipalities) Manari in the state of Pernambuco has the lowest rating in the country—0,467—putting it in last place.

Tourism
In recent years, due to the proximity of the Furnas reservoir tourism has grown substantially.  Furnas is an artificial lake fed by the Rio Grande and Sapucaí rivers and has an area of more than 1,400 km2.  It is so big—the largest in Brazil when it was built in the 1960s—that it is called the Sea of Mina Gerais.  According to the city government site, the city had 7 hotels.

Notable people
 Marcelo Garcia

References

Municipalities in Minas Gerais